Hammond may refer to:

People
 Hammond Innes (1913–1998), English novelist
 Hammond (surname)
 Justice Hammond (disambiguation)

Places

Antarctica
 Hammond Glacier, Antarctica

Australia
Hammond, South Australia, a small settlement in South Australia
Electoral district of Hammond, a state electoral district in South Australia

Canada
Hammond River, a small river in New Brunswick
Hammond Parish, New Brunswick
Hammond, Ontario, Canada, now Clarence-Rockland, Ontario
Port Hammond, British Columbia, also known as Hammond or Hammond's Landing
Upper Hammonds Plains, Nova Scotia

England
Stoke Hammond, a village in north Buckinghamshire, England

United States
Hammond, Fresno, California
Hammond Castle, a castle located in Gloucester, Massachusetts
Hammond, Georgia, now Sandy Springs, Georgia
Hammond, Illinois
Hammond, Indiana, the largest U.S. city named Hammond
Hammond Circus Train Wreck
Hammond, Kansas
Hammond, Louisiana
Hammond, Maine
Hammond, Minnesota
Hammond Township, Minnesota
Hammond, Montana
Hammond (town), New York
Hammond (village), New York, in the town of Hammond
Hammond, Oregon
 Hammond station (disambiguation), stations of the name
Hammond, Texas, a community in Robertson County, Texas
Hammond (town), Wisconsin
Hammond, Wisconsin, a village within the town of Hammond
 Hammond Township (disambiguation)
 Plant Hammond, a coal-fired power plant in Floyd County, Georgia

Other uses
 Hammond (Overwatch), a fictional character in the 2016 video game Overwatch
 Hammond High School (disambiguation)
 Hammond Map or "Hammond World Atlas Corporation", a subsidiary of the Langenscheidt Publishing Group
 Hammond organ, a musical instrument
 Hammond's postulate, a scientific hypothesis useful for understanding the thermodynamics of reactions
 Hammond Pros (1920–1926), a National Football League team from Hammond, Indiana
 USS Hamond (PF-73), also spelled Hammond, the original name of

See also
 Hamand (disambiguation)
 Hamond (disambiguation)
 Hamming (disambiguation)